Lianzhou is a town of Luoding, Guangdong, China. , it has one residential community and 16 villages under its administration.

References

Township-level divisions of Guangdong
Luoding